The Huainanzi is an ancient Chinese text that consists of a collection of essays that resulted from a series of scholarly debates held at the court of Liu An, Prince of Huainan, sometime before 139.  The Huainanzi blends Daoist, Confucianist, and Legalist concepts, including theories such as yin and yang and Wu Xing theories.

The Huainanzis essays are all connected to one primary goal: attempting to define the necessary conditions for perfect socio-political order. It concludes that perfect societal order derives mainly from a perfect ruler, and the essays are compiled in such a way as to serve as a handbook for an enlightened sovereign and his court.

The book 
Scholars are reasonably certain regarding the date of composition for the Huainanzi. Both the Book of Han and Records of the Grand Historian record that when Liu An paid a state visit to his nephew the Emperor Wu of Han in 139 BC, he presented a copy of his "recently completed" book in twenty-one chapters. Recent research shows that Chapters 1, 2, and 21 of the Huainanzi were performed at the imperial court.

The Huainanzi is an eclectic compilation of chapters or essays that range across topics of religion, history, astronomy, geography, philosophy, science, metaphysics, nature, and politics. It discusses many pre-Han schools of thought, especially the Huang–Lao form of religious Daoism, and contains more than 800 quotations from Chinese classics. The textual diversity is apparent from the chapter titles (tr. Le Blanc, 1985, 15–16):

Some Huainanzi passages are philosophically significant, for instance, this combination of Five Phases and Daoist themes.

Notable translations 
 
  Le Blanc, Charles and Mathieu, Rémi (2003). Philosophes Taoïstes II: Huainan zi. Paris: Gallimard.

Translations that focus on individual chapters include:
 Balfour, Frederic H. (1884).  Taoist Texts, Ethical, Political, and Speculative.  London: Trübner, and Shanghai: Kelly and Walsh.
 Morgan, Evan (1933).  Tao, the Great Luminant: Essays from the Huai-nan-tzu.  London: Kegan Paul, Trench, Trübner & Co.
 Wallacker, Benjamin (1962).  The Huai-nan-tzu, Book Eleven: Behavior Culture and the Cosmos.  New Haven: American Oriental Society.
  Kusuyama, Haruki  (1979–88).  E-nan-ji  [Huainanzi].  Shinshaku kanbun taikei 54, 55, 62.
  Larre, Claude (1982).  "Le Traité VIIe du Houai nan tseu: Les esprits légers et subtils animateurs de l'essence" ["Huainanzi Chapter 7 Translation: Light Spirits and Subtle Animators of Essence"]. Variétés sinologiques 67.
 Ames, Roger T. (1983).  The Art of Rulership: A Study in Ancient Chinese Political Thought.  Honolulu: University of Hawaii Press.
 Le Blanc, Charles (1985).  Huai nan tzu; Philosophical Synthesis in Early Han Thought: The Idea of Resonance (Kan-ying) With a Translation and Analysis of Chapter Six.  Hong Kong: Hong Kong University Press.
 Major, John S. (1993).  Heaven and Earth in Early Han Thought: Chapters Three, Four and Five of the Huainanzi.  Albany: State University of New York Press.
 Ames, Roger T. and D.C. Lau (1998). Yuan Dao: Tracing Dao to Its Source. New York: Ballantine Books.

Television series 
 The Legend of Huainanzi

References

Citations

Sources

External links 

 淮南子 - Chinese Text Project
 淮南子, original text in Chinese 21 chapters
 淮南子, original text in Chinese 21 chapters
 淮南子, original text in Chinese 21 chapters
 Tao, the Great Luminant, Morgan's translation
 Huainan-zi, Sanderson Beck's article
 Huainanzi, Chinaknowledge article

Chinese classic texts
Han dynasty texts
Han dynasty literature
Taoist texts
2nd-century BC books